Vase with White and Red Carnations is a work by Vincent van Gogh. It is an oil on canvas painting in a private collection, painted in the summer of 1886 in Paris. The painting depicts white and red carnation flowers in a gold and dark brown vase.

Provenance:

References

Bibliography
 Van Gogh, V and Leeuw, R (1997) [1996]. van Crimpen, H, Berends-Albert, M. ed. The Letters of Vincent van Gogh. London and other locations: Penguin Books.
 

Paintings by Vincent van Gogh
Paintings of Paris by Vincent van Gogh
1886 paintings
Still life paintings